The R237 road is a regional road in Ireland which links the Republic of Ireland–United Kingdom border at Killea with the N13 road in County Donegal. 

See also 

 Roads in Ireland
 National primary road
 National secondary road

References 

Regional roads in the Republic of Ireland

Roads in County Donegal